The following is a chronological capsule history of 1960s counterculture. Influential events and milestones years before and after the 1960s are included for context relevant to the subject period of the early 1960s through the mid-1970s.

1950s

1951
 The True Believer: "Longshoreman-philosopher" Eric Hoffer's Thoughts on the Nature of Mass Movements is published.

1952
 August: Mad magazine debuts as a comic book before switching to standard magazine format in 1955, satirizing both American culture and later counterculture alike.
 Invisible Man: Ralph Ellison's highly acclaimed novel of African American life in the 20th century is published.
 Go: John Clellon Holmes' novel is published and is later considered to be the first book depicting the Beat Generation.

1953
 April 13: Project MKUltra, the CIA's behavior control research program which grew to include testing LSD and extended sensory deprivation on both volunteer and unsuspecting American and Canadian subjects into the 1960s, commences. Secret detention camps in Europe and Asia are also set up for torture and experiments on prisoners.
 May 4: The "doors of perception" open for author Aldous Huxley as he takes mescaline for the first time. Humphrey Osmond guides the trip, and later correspondence between the two produces the term psychedelic.
 December: Marilyn Monroe centerfold: the first issue of Playboy magazine appears, published by Hugh Hefner.

1954
 May 17: Brown vs. Board of Education: The US Supreme Court rules unanimously that racial segregation in public schools is unconstitutional. The doctrine of "Separate but Equal" as a moral or legal pretext for segregation is no longer enforceable by governments, and true racial integration begins in schools in the southern US.

1955
 February: SEATO: The Southeast Asia Treaty Organization is formally activated, nominally obligating the US to intervene as part of collective action in case of military conflagration in the region. The non-binding SEATO commitment, however, is only invoked as justification for involvement in Vietnam by future President Lyndon Baines Johnson (LBJ) after later escalation of hostilities there proves unpopular.
 July 9: "Rock Around the Clock": Bill Haley's version of the keystone song begins an eight-week run at number 1 on the Billboard charts. With deep roots in black jazz, blues, and R&B, as well as gospel and country music, the rock & roll era begins.
 August 28: Emmett Till murder: A black adolescent is brutally slain in Mississippi after allegedly flirting with a white woman. The incident becomes a pivotal event in the growing civil rights movement after Till's mother allows the boy's mutilated body to be viewed, and after two white men (who later confess to the murder) are acquitted by an all-white, all-male jury. In 2017, Till's apparently coerced female accuser recanted key testimony she gave under oath.
 September 30: James Dean: The star of Rebel without a Cause and early icon of the disaffected generation dies in a sports car crash at age 24 at Cholame, California.
 October 7: Six Gallery Reading: Beat poet Allen Ginsberg first performs his soon-to-be scandalous Howl.
 October 26: The Village Voice: One of the earliest and most enduring alternative newspapers is launched by Ed Fancher, Dan Wolf, John Wilcock and Norman Mailer in New York City. The paper ceased publication in 2018, still hoping to digitize its vast and unique archive.
 December 1: Activist Rosa Parks refuses to cede her seat on a public bus to a white passenger in Montgomery, Alabama, and is arrested. A successful bus boycott by local blacks led by Dr. Martin Luther King Jr. ensues, while the ACLU takes on and wins Parks' legal case. After over a year of black boycott, the US Supreme Court orders the desegregation of Montgomery's bus system.

1956
 April 21: "Heartbreak Hotel": Elvis Presley's first number 1 hit tops the charts for eight weeks as Presley creates teenage pandemonium in households in the US and subsequently across the rest of the western world.
 August: The FBI's COINTELPRO domestic counterintelligence program commences. The surveillance effort is initially directed against stateside communist activities, but grows to include illegal invasions of privacy targeting civil rights and anti-war activists, particularly black activists.

1957
 Masters and Johnson begin scientific research into human sexual response in the Department of Obstetrics and Gynecology at Washington University School of Medicine. The first of many widely read books regarding their research is published in 1966.
 January 10: The Southern Christian Leadership Conference (SCLC) civil rights organization is formed in Atlanta, Georgia.
 September 5: On the Road: Years in the works, a somewhat tamed version of Jack Kerouac's seminal novel of the Beat Generation is published.
 September 23: US President Dwight D. Eisenhower signs an executive order sending federal troops to maintain peace and order during the racial integration of Central High School in Little Rock, Arkansas.
 October 4: The western world is shocked and deeply fearful when the USSR launches Sputnik 1, the first artificial space satellite. The ability to launch a satellite equates to the ability to launch an intercontinental ballistic missile, thereby directly threatening much of the world with long-range missile attack for the first time. Confidence is further shaken in December, when Vanguard, the rushed US attempt to equal Sputnik, explodes on the launchpad.
 November 15: Albert Schweitzer, Coretta Scott King, and Benjamin Spock post an ad in The New York Times calling for an end to the nuclear arms race. SANE is later formed.

1958
 February 17: The Campaign for Nuclear Disarmament is inaugurated in London, introducing the "Peace symbol" from the letters CND.
 March 24: Elvis Presley, the biggest recording star in the world, is inducted into the US Army. Presley serves his two years honorably.
 April 2: Herb Caen of the San Francisco Chronicle coins the term beatnik to refer to aficionados of the Beat Generation.
 April 4–7: Over the Easter weekend, in London's Trafalgar Square, thousands protest in the first major Aldermaston march, organised by the Direct Action Committee Against Nuclear War and supported by CND. The protests are accompanied by a festival with jazz and skiffle bands.
 SANE claims 25,000 members in 130 chapters.
 The New Left SLATE student political party is formed at the University of California, Berkeley.
 Eisenhower is the first US president to ask a joint session of Congress to pass the long-debated Equal Rights Amendment.
 The Affluent Society: Harvard economist John Kenneth Galbraith's highly influential work is published.

1959
 January 1: Revolutionary forces under the leadership of Fidel Castro overthrow the corrupt Batista government in Cuba. Fifty years of repressive rule by the future Soviet ally ensue before Castro relinquishes control to his brother.
 February 3: The Day the Music Died: Early rock stars Buddy Holly, Ritchie Valens and The Big Bopper are killed along with the pilot of a small plane in bad weather near Clear Lake, IA. Guitarist Tommy Allsup "loses" his seat after a coin-flip with Valens, and Holly's bass player (and future country music legend) Waylon Jennings also misses the doomed flight when he allows the ill "Bopper" to take his seat. In 1972, Don McLean's "American Pie" is released, and is later called "the accessible farewell to the Fifties and Sixties."
 June 16: Superman is dead?: Front-page headlines allege that actor George Reeves' shooting death is a suicide, shocking a generation of youngsters mourning the first major superhero of comic books and television. Reeves' death is later considered by many to be a murder.
 September 29: Beatnik goes TV: The Many Loves of Dobie Gillis debuts, featuring Bob Denver as beat character Maynard G. Krebs.
 How to Speak Hip: Improv pioneers Del Close and John Brent's satirical comedy record is released and formalizes hip parlance for a generation.

1960s

1960
 The Student League for Industrial Democracy changes its name to Students for a Democratic Society (SDS) and first meets in Ann Arbor, Michigan. SDS dissociates itself from LID in 1965, and becomes the most notable radical student political organization of the counterculture era.
 A beatnik community in Cornwall, UK noted for wearing their hair past their shoulders, and including a young Wizz Jones, is interviewed by Alan Whicker for BBC TV.
 Harvard lecturer Timothy Leary and assistant professor Richard Alpert begin experimenting with hallucinogens at Cambridge, MA. The highly controversial Leary soon becomes the most notable advocate of LSD use during the era.
 February 1: The first of the Greensboro sit-ins sparks a wave of similar protests against segregation at Woolworth and other retail store lunch counters across the American South.
 March 26: Governor Buford Ellington of Tennessee orders an investigation into a CBS news crew for filming a Nashville sit-in.
 April: The Student Nonviolent Coordinating Committee (SNCC) is organized by Ella Baker at Shaw University.
 May 1: U-2 Incident: a US spy plane searching for Soviet nuclear installations is shot down deep within the USSR. Presumed dead by the US, the CIA pilot Francis Gary Powers is captured alive and paraded in the Russian press after the White House enlists NASA in a botched and quickly exposed deception claiming that the plane went missing during a weather flight.
 May 9: The Pill: The US Food & Drug Administration approves the use of the first reliable form of birth control: a 99%-effective pill. The Sexual revolution commences, first in the bedrooms of married couples.
 May 13: Black Friday: 400 police using firehoses force a student "mob" out of a HUAC meeting at City Hall in San Francisco. The counterculture era of student political protest, outside of the ongoing civil rights movement, begins.
 May 19: SANE holds an anti-arms race rally at Madison Square Garden in New York, NY. 20,000 attend.
 July 11: To Kill A Mockingbird: Harper Lee's Pulitzer Prize-winning story of racial inequality is published and becomes a classic of American literature. The story arrives in cinemas in 1962.
 November 8: John F. Kennedy is elected 35th President of the US, defeating sitting Vice President Richard Nixon in what is considered to be the closest and most intellectually charged US presidential election since 1916. Nearly 70 million ballots are cast, but the margin of victory is approximately 100,000 votes.

1961
 January: Look Magazine journalist George Leonard writes about "Youth of the Sixties: The Explosive Generation" and predicts that the "quiet generation" of the 1950s "is rumbling and is going to explode".
 January 17: US President (and retired 5-Star Army General) Dwight Eisenhower gives his farewell address to the nation, and uses much of his time to warn of the undue influence of the "military–industrial complex".
 January 20: In a powerful inaugural address, new US President Kennedy calls upon citizens to "ask not what your country can do for you – ask what you can do for your country".
 March 1: JFK signs an executive order creating the Peace Corps.
 March 28: Although he supported the program during the 1960 campaign, JFK orders final cancellation of full production of the oft-resurrected USAF B-70 Bomber program in a significant rollback of the nuclear arms race.
 March 30: The UN Single Convention on Narcotic Drugs is signed in New York City, tightening controls on international trade in opiates.
 April 12: Vostok: Man in Space: The western world is again shocked when Cold War rival the USSR follows its Sputnik triumph, putting the first human in space, Yuri Gargarin.
 April 17: Bay of Pigs: A secret CIA-led invasion force intent on the overthrow of communist dictator Fidel Castro lands on a remote beach in Cuba. Anti-Castro Cuban expatriates and CIA mercenaries are overtaken and captured by Cuban forces. JFK attempts to cut losses and denies additional US air support, dooming the operation.
 May 4: Freedom Riders: Civil rights activists travel on public buses and trains across the American South to personally confront and challenge segregation.
 June 4: JFK meets with Soviet Premier Nikita Khrushchev in Vienna, and reports no progress on issues concerning partitioned Germany. Another Berlin Crisis ensues.
 July: Amnesty International is formed in London after British attorney Peter Benenson is outraged by the arrest of two students who raise a toast to freedom in Portugal. The human rights organization wins the Nobel Peace Prize in 1977.
 August 13: Berlin Wall: To stem the massive tide of emigration from the communist east into the democratic west (200,000 escape East Germany in 1960 alone), the construction of a wall dividing the city of Berlin begins under Soviet direction.
 October 25: US and Soviet tanks face off at Checkpoint Charlie in Berlin.
 November 1: Women Strike for Peace: 50,000 women march in 60 cities in the US to demonstrate against nuclear weapons.
 November 30: Cuban Project: Aggressive covert operations against Fidel Castro's revolutionary rule in Cuba are authorized by JFK and soon implemented under the direction of his brother, Attorney General Robert F. Kennedy. Implementation of the plan is highly unorthodox, as command oversight is given to the new Attorney General, and not career military or intelligence officers.
 December 14: JFK signs an executive order establishing the Presidential Commission on the Status of Women.

1962
 January: Black is Beautiful: The African Jazz-Art Society stages "Naturally '62," a fashion show in Harlem, popularizing the phrase which would become important to the culture of the civil rights movement.
 January 12: Operation Chopper: US forces participate in major combat in Vietnam for the first time.
 January 18: Operation Ranch Hand: The US military begins the use of extremely toxic and carcinogenic defoliants in Vietnam. Use of the dioxin-containing Agent Orange begins in 1965.
 February 4: Escalation: In another of the first air actions of the deepening conflict, US helicopters assist the South Vietnamese Army in the capture of Hung My.
 February 26: Soviet Deputy Foreign Minister Valerian Zorin warns the UN that the Americans "are getting bogged down in a very disadvantageous and politically unjustified war (in Vietnam) which will entail very unpleasant consequences for them."
 March 16: US Defense Secretary Robert McNamara reveals that US troops in Vietnam have engaged in ground combat.
 March 19: Bob Dylan's self-named first album is released. It reaches #13 in the UK, but does not chart on the Billboard 200 in the US. Dylan's second album, The Freewheelin' Bob Dylan, makes an enormous impact on the US folk and pop music scenes in 1963.
 March 31: Cesar Chavez begins organizing migrant farm workers in California.
 June 15: The SDS completes the Port Huron Statement, its manifesto calling for participatory democracy and non-violent civil disobedience as well as outlining its perceived problems with modern society.
 July–August: The Albany Movement civil rights protest against segregation is active in Albany, GA.
 August 5: Film star Marilyn Monroe dies of a barbiturate overdose under suspicious circumstances in Los Angeles. Monroe's death is a precursor to an explosion of recreational use of highly addictive prescription drugs (and thousands of accidental pill overdose deaths) during the counterculture era, even as legitimate use of these drugs is already in decline.
 September 12: John F. Kennedy speaks at Rice University: "... we choose to go to the moon in this decade and do the other things, not because they are easy, but because they are hard ..."
 September 27: Silent Spring: Following a growing groundswell of reports on the deleterious effects of DDT use on the ecosystem, Rachel Carson's exposé is published and the modern environmental movement begins.
 October 1: Following a riot which leaves 2 dead and over 300 injured on September 30, James Meredith is the first African-American student to enter "Ole Miss".
 October 5: "Love Me Do": The Beatles' first single is released in the UK. From this modest beginning the group eventually goes on to sell over 600 million records worldwide and remains the best selling musical group of all time. Earlier in the year, Decca Records and others had chosen not to sign the group.
 October 16–28: The Cuban Missile Crisis brings the world to the brink of nuclear war after the USSR attempts to station missiles with nuclear warheads in Cuba, thereby directly challenging the longstanding Monroe Doctrine and threatening the US. On October 22, President Kennedy bluntly addresses the nation on the matter of "highest national urgency" and discusses the possibility of global nuclear war, terrifying the nation and world. JFK's generals advise him to invade Cuba, but Kennedy orders a naval blockade instead. The Soviets back down and remove the missiles.
 December: The USAF Skybolt air-launched ballistic missile program is canceled by President Kennedy.
 Inspired by Aldous Huxley's Human Potential Movement, Michael Murphy and Dick Price found the Esalen Institute in Big Sur, California.
 Sex and the Single Girl: Helen Gurley Brown's post-pill career and dating manual becomes a best-seller. Brown's attempt to have the book "banned" for marketing purposes fails, but early sales top two million copies. Brown goes on to edit influential Cosmopolitan Magazine for over 30 years.
 The Other America: Michael Harrington's compelling study of the intractable plight of the poor in the US is published. The book is later credited as inspirational to LBJ's "War on poverty."
 Ken Kesey's One Flew Over the Cuckoo's Nest is published. The novel draws in part from Kesey's experiences as an MKUltra volunteer. An Oscar-winning adaptation hits theaters in 1975.
 Seven Days in May, a novel depicting a foiled military coup in the US, is published. A film follows in 1964 with an all-star cast.

1963
 Bob Fass begins the long-running, late night Radio Unnameable program on WBAI-FM in New York City, a listener-supported station that is later remembered as "the pulse of the movement" by Wavy Gravy.
 February 19: Influenced by Simone de Beauvoir's The Second Sex, Betty Friedan's The Feminine Mystique is published. The modern feminist movement is born.
 April: Chandler Laughlin organizes a Native American Church peyote ceremony, a forerunner to the Red Dog Experience.
 April–May: Birmingham Campaign: Civil rights activists organized by James Bevel and Martin Luther King are attacked by police in Birmingham, Alabama. Similar events occur at various locations across the deep south throughout the spring and summer.
 May: Louie Louie: The Kingsmen's version of the rock party standard is released. An FBI investigation revolves around the song's purportedly obscene lyrics but leads nowhere. Extraneous to the garbled lyrics, the drummer yelling "fuck" is barely audible 54 seconds into the song.
 May: The first organized Vietnam War protests occur in England and Australia.
 May 1: Undercover Bunny: Gloria Steinem's Playboy Club exposé appears in Show Magazine.
 June 10: A Strategy of Peace: JFK delivers a powerful commencement speech at American University.
 June 11: Buddhist monk Thich Quang Duc self-immolates in Saigon. AP photographer Malcolm Browne's coverage of the horrific event reportedly motivates JFK to increase US troop strength in the developing Vietnam War.
 June 12: NAACP Field Secretary Medgar Evers is assassinated in Jackson, MS.
 June 17: The US Supreme Court rules in Abington School District v. Schempp that public school-sponsored Bible reading is unconstitutional.
 July 26–28: The now-legendary Newport Folk Festival features Bob Dylan and fellow protest singers Pete Seeger, Joan Baez, Phil Ochs, and Peter, Paul & Mary.
 August 28: I Have a Dream: Dr. Martin Luther King Jr. gives his landmark speech before 200,000 on the National Mall in Washington, DC during the March on Washington for Jobs and Freedom.
 September 24: The US Senate ratifies The Partial Test Ban Treaty as signed by the US, USSR, and UK, ending testing of nuclear weapons under water, in the atmosphere, and in space.
 September 26: The US Senate debates a report that folk music is being infiltrated by communism. Two senators speak and conclude it is "American," dismissing the report.
 October 27: 225,000 students in Chicago public schools boycott classes in protest at ongoing segregation.
 October 31: Harvard University is scandalized by disclosure that students have engaged in on-campus "sex orgies."
 November 2: South Vietnamese President Ngo Dinh Diem is assassinated in Saigon.
 November 22: US President John F. Kennedy is assassinated in Dallas, TX at age 46. Vice President Lyndon B. Johnson is sworn in as 36th President of the US.
 November 24: Suspected JFK assassin Lee Harvey Oswald is himself murdered by Jack Ruby under lax police security in Dallas, thereby creating doubt for many, and opening the door to myriad conspiracy theories concerning the Kennedy Assassination and the veracity of later government findings.

1964
 January: The Holy Modal Rounders' version of "Hesitation Blues" marks the first reference to the term psychedelic in popular music.
 January 8: LBJ's State of the Union address features a declaration of "War on poverty".
 January 13: The Times They Are A-Changin': Bob Dylan's 3rd album is released and the title track is soon considered to be the most prophetic and relevant American protest song of the era. Dylan disagrees, saying the song "is a feeling."
 January 23: 24th Amendment ratified: US Congress and states are prohibited from conditioning the right to vote in federal elections on payment of a poll tax or other forms of tax.
 February 1: I Want to Hold Your Hand: The Beatles achieve their first hit No. 1 on Billboard with a 7-week run on top. Beatlemania has spread to the US, and the monumental British Invasion of UK music across the free world is underway.
 February 3: Nearly half a million public school students participate in the New York City school boycott of classes in protest of segregation.
 February 7–22: The Beatles make their first US visit and are showcased three times on The Ed Sullivan Show. The February 9 telecast is seen by over 73 million, the largest TV audience to date in the US.
 February 25–26: Tens of thousands of school students in Boston and Chicago skip classes in protest of segregation.
 April 4: Beatles singles occupy the top 5 slots on the Billboard Hot 100. It's an unprecedented, and never repeated, chart achievement.
 April 13: Sidney Poitier becomes the first man of African descent to win the Oscar for Best Actor, Santa Monica, CA.
 April 20: Approximately 85% of black students in Cleveland boycott classes to protest segregation.
 May: Robert Jasper Grootveld's surreal happenings begin in Spui square Amsterdam with his unpredictable performances and famous cries of "Klaas is Coming!" and "Uche, Uche, Uche". Later described as the "announcer of the international spirit of revolution" he gained a following of Nozems (Dutch rockers) and inspired the start of the Provo (Provocation) movement in both Holland and California, introducing a playful element into social protest.
 May: Appearance of the Faire Free Press (later the Los Angeles Free Press), earliest of many "underground" US newspapers of the 1960s counterculture era.
 May: San Francisco Sheraton Palace Hotel sit-ins result in arrests of University of California, Berkeley students protesting racially discriminatory Bay area hiring practices.
 May 7: President Johnson first refers to "the Great Society" in a speech at Ohio University, Athens, OH.
 May 12: The first public draft-card burning is reported in New York City.
 June 14: The Merry Pranksters: Led by author Ken Kesey, an assemblage of adventure seekers departs California in the repurposed school bus Further en route to the 1964 World's Fair in Queens, NY.
 June 22: I Know it When I See it: The US Supreme Court overturns the obscenity conviction of an Ohio theater operator. Although local obscenity battles continue to the present, the decision clears the way for the commercial exhibition of sexually explicit film material in the US.
 July 2: The Civil Rights Act of 1964 is signed by President Johnson. Racial segregation in public places and race-based employment discrimination are now banned under federal law.
 August 2: Undeclared war- the spurious Gulf of Tonkin Incidents off the coast of Vietnam lead to the nearly unanimous passage of the Gulf of Tonkin Resolution by the US Congress on August 7, giving the president unprecedented broad authority to engage in full "conventional" military escalation in Southeast Asia without a formal declaration of war.
 August 28: The Beatles reportedly use marijuana for the first time, compliments of Bob Dylan, New York City.
 September: Two National Farmers Organization members are killed when they and about 500 others attempt to stop a truck from taking cattle to market.
 October 1: The Free Speech Movement begins with a student sit-in at the University of California, Berkeley.
 October 14: Dr. Martin Luther King Jr. wins the Nobel Peace Prize.
 October 25: The Rolling Stones appear on The Ed Sullivan Show and create so much audience disruption that Sullivan bans the "lewd" group from his show. The Stones are back, however, in future years.
 November 3: Sitting President Lyndon B. Johnson is elected President of the US in his own right, defeating Republican Arizona Senator Barry Goldwater in a landslide.
 November 4: Comedian Lenny Bruce is convicted on obscenity charges in New York City after performing a routine about Eleanor Roosevelt's "tits" and other "offensive" subject matter. Bruce is soon sentenced to a workhouse.
 December 2: Put Your Bodies Upon the Gears: In a now-famous speech during a Berkeley sit-in, student Mario Savio tells supporters of the Free Speech Movement to protest the "machine" of the college's administration.

1965
 February 8: Aerial bombing of North Vietnam by the US commences with Operation Rolling Thunder.
 February 9–15: Thousands demonstrate against the US attacks on North Vietnam at the US Embassies in Moscow, Budapest, Jakarta, and Sofia.
 February 21: Malcolm X is assassinated in New York City.
 March: Several protestors are arrested for speaking obscenities in the "Filthy Speech Movement" at UC Berkeley.
 March 7–25: The SCLC stages the watershed Selma to Montgomery marches, initially organized by James Bevel.
 March 8: 1,400 Marines of the U.S. 9th Marine Expeditionary Brigade begin to land on beaches near Da Nang. The arrival of the Marines heralds the direct involvement of American combat units in the war.
 March 16: Alice Herz, age 82, self-immolates in Detroit, MI in protest of Vietnam escalation. Herz dies 10 days later.
 March 24–25: The first major "Teach-in" is held by the SDS in Ann Arbor, MI. 3000 attend.
 March 25: For Your Love: Already a guitar legend, blues purist Eric Clapton quits The Yardbirds after release of the proto-psychedelic hit. Clapton recommends Jimmy Page to fill his spot. Page passes, but suggests Jeff Beck, who accepts. In 1966, Page joins the group.
 Spring: Don't trust anyone over 30: Berkeley grad student and Free Speech activist Jack Weinberg's quip is quoted in paraphrase, inadvertently creating a key catchphrase of the generation.
 Spring: A circle of late-beat-era folk musicians including John Phillips, Michelle Phillips, Cass Elliot, and Denny Doherty rusticate in a communal beach tent on St. Thomas to party and create music. The working vacation, financed on Phillips' American Express card, results in the formation of The Mamas and the Papas, and a lucrative recording contract. The events are recounted in song on the group's hit 1967 single "Creeque Alley".
 April: Beatles John Lennon and George Harrison experience LSD for the first time at a UK dinner party hosted by Harrison's dentist.
 April: US combat troops in Vietnam total 25,000.
 April 16: Needle of Death: The debut album of Scottish folk musician Bert Jansch features a song of warning concerning the deadly dangers of heroin.
 April 17: The first major anti-Vietnam War rally in the US is organized by the SDS in Washington, DC. 20,000 attend the March Against the Vietnam War. Joan Baez, Judy Collins, and Phil Ochs perform.
 May: Owsley Stanley returns to the Bay Area with the first large batch of LSD for sale as a recreational drug.
 May 5: Draft card burnings take place at Berkeley. Several hundred UC Berkeley students march on the Berkeley Draft Board (BDB) and present the staff with a black coffin.
 May: Jerry Rubin, Stephen Smale, Paul Montauk, Abbie Hoffman and others form the Vietnam Day Committee.
 May 17: Hunter S. Thompson's article "The Motorcycle Gangs: A portrait of an outsider underground" appears in The Nation. A book soon follows.
 May 20–22: The Vietnam Day Committee organizes the largest Vietnam teach-in to date. 30,000 attend the 36-hour event at Berkeley, including Benjamin Spock, Norman Thomas, Norman Mailer, Mario Savio, Paul Krassner, Dick Gregory and Phil Ochs. Hundreds march to the draft board, where Lyndon Johnson is hanged in effigy, and many burn draft cards.
 May: Drop City: One of the earliest hippie communes is founded in Colorado, US. The Droppers build geodesic domes from trashed automobile hoods and roofs, notably involving collaborations with Steve Baer and Buckminster Fuller inspired Zomes.
 June–August: Red Dog Experience comes into full flower at Virginia City, Nevada's Red Dog Saloon – full-fledged "hippie" identity takes shape.
 June 7: Griswold v. Connecticut: The US Supreme Court rules that Constitutional privacy guarantees trump a Connecticut statute banning use of contraceptives by married couples. "Comstock-era" laws are likewise now moot in other states. In 1972, the court rules that protections apply to unmarried couples as well.
 June 11: International Poetry Incarnation: Notables including Allen Ginsberg, Lawrence Ferlinghetti, Michael Horovitz, and William S. Burroughs participate in a breakthrough event for the UK underground, Royal Albert Hall, London.
 June 11: The Beatles are appointed as Members of the Most Excellent Order of the British Empire (MBE) by Queen Elizabeth for their contributions to British arts and commerce. The myth that the group smoked marijuana in a palace bathroom after the investiture ceremony in October is later debunked by George Harrison.
 July 25: Bob Dylan "goes electric" and is booed by some at the Newport Folk Festival.
 July 30: Medicare is signed into law in the US, giving seniors a healthcare safety net.
 August: Phil Ochs releases the satirical "Draft Dodger Rag" on the album I Ain't Marching Anymore. He later performs the song on the CBS News Special Avoiding the Draft. Pete Seeger's version appears in 1966.
 August 6: The Voting Rights Act is signed into law in the US; "Literacy tests", poll taxes and other local schemes to prevent voting by blacks are newly or further banned under federal law.
 August 11: Watts: Six days of massive race riots erupt in Watts, Los Angeles: 34 dead, 1000 injuries, hundreds of buildings looted or destroyed, and thousands of arrests. Meanwhile, smaller riots occur in Chicago.
 August 24: She Said She Said: Shortly after setting a concert attendance record at Shea Stadium, Queens, NY, the Beatles briefly rest in Benedict Canyon, near the end of their grueling American tour. With ongoing Beatlemania preventing the band from leaving their rented home, they invite local company, including members of the Byrds, Peter Fonda, Joan Baez, and Peggy Lipton. Lennon writes a song, which appears on Revolver in 1966. As the era progresses, nearby Laurel Canyon becomes home to many prominent counterculture musicians.
 August 30: Bob Dylan's Highway 61 Revisited is released featuring the six-minute single "Like a Rolling Stone".
 August 31: The ban on the burning of draft cards is signed into law in the US.
 September 5: The word hippie is used in print by San Francisco writer Michael Fallon, helping popularise use of the term in the media, although the tag was seen elsewhere earlier, notably in a remark about pot cookies in syndicated journalist Dorothy Kilgallen's June 11, 1963, column.
 September 8: Actress Dorothy Dandridge, the first African-American nominated for a Best Actress Oscar, dies of an apparent accidental prescription drug overdose in Los Angeles, although a later analysis suggests a rare embolism may have been the cause.
 September 15: I-Spy: Comedian Bill Cosby becomes the first African-American to star in a dramatic American television series. (Amanda Randolph had starred in the comedy The Laytons on the short-lived DuMont Network in the late 1940s.)
 September 25: The Beatles Saturday morning cartoon series debuts on US TV.
 September 25: Eve of Destruction: Barry McGuire's version of P.F. Sloan's work becomes the first protest song to hit No. 1 in the charts, while drawing heavy criticism and being banned by many stations.
 October: The Yardbirds, featuring Jeff Beck, release the single "Shapes of Things" with the B-side "Still I'm Sad." Psychedelic rock first makes the charts.
 October 1: The East Village Other begins publication in East Village, Manhattan, New York City.
 October 15–16: Vietnam War protests in cities across the US draw 100,000.
 October 16: A Tribute to Dr. Strange: Dan Hicks helps organize a Family Dog event where 1,000 original San Francisco "hippies" party en masse at Longshoreman's Hall. Still legal, Owsley's "White Lightning" acid (LSD) is available to all.
 November: The Autobiography of Malcolm X is published posthumously by Grove Press. Derived from interviews of the slain activist by writer Alex Haley, it is considered to be one of the most influential works of non-fiction of the 20th century. Doubleday's cancellation of their original contract for the bestseller is later called the biggest mistake in publishing history.
 November 2: Quaker leader Norman Morrison self-immolates at the Pentagon to protest the war. Secretary of Defense McNamara witnesses the horror from his office in the building.
 November 5: My Generation: The Who speak to the new youth. "This is my generation!" and "I hope I die before I get old" become mantras of the rising counterculture.
 November 9: Catholic activist Roger Allen LaPorte self-immolates at the UN building in New York City.
 November 19: Fifth Estate: The first issue of the long-running anti-authoritarian newspaper is published in Detroit.
 November 20: 8,000 anti-war protesters march from Berkeley to Oakland in CA.
 November 27: Ken Kesey's Merry Pranksters hold the first "Acid Test" at Soquel, CA.
 November 27: Up to 35,000 anti-war protesters march on the White House.
 November 30: Unsafe at Any Speed: Activist attorney Ralph Nader's wake-up call concerning automotive safety is published and fuels the modern Consumer Movement. Nader's ongoing work contributes to the passage of the US National Traffic and Motor Vehicle Safety Act of 1966. In 1972 alone, annual US highway deaths peak at 54,589, approaching the total number of war dead during the entire 10-year US combat involvement in Vietnam.
 December: California Dreamin': A westward clarion call is released by The Mamas and the Papas.
 December: The Pretty Things release Get the Picture?. The album includes a song entitled £.S.D.
 December 3: The Beatles' Rubber Soul is released in the UK with a visually distorted image of the group on the cover. The album contains "Norwegian Wood", which sparks the "great sitar explosion" in pop music.
 December 23: Timothy Leary is arrested for drug possession at the Mexican border.

1966
 January 8: 2,400 attend when the "Acid Tests" arrive at the Fillmore West in San Francisco.
 January 21–23: Chet Helms' Family Dog "Trips Festival" is attended by 10,000 in San Francisco; half are under the influence of LSD.
 February 10: Valley of the Dolls: Jacqueline Susann's best-selling novel of sex and the perils of prescription drug abuse by women is published.
 March 8: London Free School is launched by John "Hoppy" Hopkins and Rhaune Laslett, leading to the start of the International Times/IT, the UFO Club and the Notting Hill Carnival as a street party featuring some of the earliest performances of Pink Floyd.
 March 11: Timothy Leary is sentenced to 30 years for his 1965 Mexican border drug offense.
 March 14: Eight Miles High: The Byrds' psychedelic 12-string-electric guitar anthem is released and briefly banned on radio due to perceived drug-culture subject matter.
 March 16: 12 Australians burn their draft cards at a Sydney rally against Australia's participation in the Vietnam War.
 March 25–27: Anti-Vietnam War demonstrations take place in many cities across the US and around the world.
 April: What a Drag it is Getting Old: "Mother's Little Helper", the Stones' single about prescription pill-popping housewives is released in the UK. "Doctor Robert", the Beatles' nod to a most liberally prescribing physician, appears in June.
 April 5: US Food and Drug Administration warns about the danger of LSD in a letter to 2,000 universities.
 April 7: Sandoz, the sole legitimate manufacturer of pharmaceutical-grade LSD, stops supplying the drug to researchers.
 April 17: Millbrook: Under the auspices of then-prosecutor G. Gordon Liddy, Timothy Leary is arrested for possession of marijuana at his upstate NY retreat, a haven of East Coast hippie activity. Liddy cannot bust Leary for possession of still-legal LSD.
 May 7: Psychedelic bellwether "Paint It Black" is released in the US by the Rolling Stones.
 May 12: Students take over the administration building at the University of Chicago in protest of the draft.
 May 15: 10,000 anti-war protesters picket the White House.
 May 16: The Beach Boys release the highly influential album Pet Sounds.
 May 18: 10,000 students rally against the draft at the University of Wisconsin, Madison.
 May 29: The phrase "Black Power" re-emerges in 1960s Civil Rights context.
 May 30: Featuring reversed sounds for the first time on a pop recording, the Beatles' psychedelic "Rain" is released as the B-side of "Paperback Writer".
 May/June: Resurgence magazine is first published in the UK. Notable contributors will include E.F. Schumacher, Ivan Illich, R. D. Laing and The Dalai Lama.
 June 4: The New York Times publishes a petition to end the Vietnam War, with 6,400 signatures including many prominent scholars and clergy.
 June 10: After appearing in a TV documentary in January, Donovan is arrested in London for possession of cannabis, and is perhaps the first notable counterculture musician to be targeted in the growing war on drugs. The incident is later called "ridiculous" and "comical".
 June 13: Miranda v. Arizona: The US Supreme Court rules that the Fifth Amendment to the US Constitution provides protection against self-incrimination, requiring law enforcement officials to advise a suspect interrogated while in custody of their right to remain silent and their right to obtain an attorney.
 June 25: Lenny Bruce performs for the last time. The show at the Fillmore West in San Francisco also showcases Frank Zappa.
 June 27: Freak Out!, a pioneer concept album, is released by Frank Zappa's Mothers of Invention.
 June 30: The National Organization of Women (NOW) is founded in Washington, DC.
 June 30: In their tour press conference in Tokyo, the Beatles speak out publicly against the Vietnam War for the first time, defying their manager Brian Epstein's insistence that they remain apolitical. During the band's subsequent US tour, in August, George Harrison says: "War is wrong, and it's obvious it's wrong. And that's all that needs to be said about it."
 July: Beatle backlash: US Bible Belt DJs incite thousands to burn Beatle records after the viral spread of John Lennon's misunderstood "we're more popular than Jesus" comment.
 July: Sunshine Superman: Donovan's hit contains the first open reference to "tripping" in a chart-topping song.
 July: After skipping an invitation to a breakfast reception from Philippines' dictators Ferdinand & Imelda Marcos, the Beatles find themselves without police protection and in fear for their lives. John Lennon states that "if we go back, it will be with an H-Bomb."
 July 16: Wes Wilson's rock concert poster for The Association, playing at the Fillmore, is the first significant psychedelic rock concert poster, after which many follow for other concerts, and the style becomes significant. 
 July 29: Bob Dylan crashes his motorcycle near Woodstock, New York, and begins a period of much-needed rest from public life.
 July–September: Riots break out throughout the summer in several US cities, with deaths in Chicago and Cleveland (July), Waukegan, Illinois, and Benton Harbor, Michigan (August), and damage in many other cities.
 August 3: Lenny Bruce, called "the most radically relevant of all contemporary social satirists" is found dead at age 40 from a morphine overdose in Los Angeles.
 August 5: The Beatles release their album Revolver, which includes "Tomorrow Never Knows", a song that came to be widely regarded as "the most effective evocation of a LSD experience ever recorded". The track is founded on a single-chord tambura drone and features tape loops, backward sounds and other musique concrète elements, and lyrics taken from Timothy Leary's The Psychedelic Experience: A Manual Based on the Tibetan Book of the Dead.
 August 29: Candlestick Park: The Beatles perform their final concert in San Francisco, before retiring from live performance.
 September 9: LSD is banned in the UK.
 September 12: US TV's response to the Beatles, The Monkees, debuts on NBC. In 1967, the band outsells the Beatles and the Rolling Stones combined.
 September 19: Timothy Leary begins his "Turn on, tune in, drop out" crusade in New York City, founding the LSD religion "League for Spiritual Discovery".
 September 20: Anti-establishment publisher Allen Cohen's underground newspaper The San Francisco Oracle begins publication in the Haight-Ashbury district.
 October 6: LSD is banned in the US.
 October 6: Love Pageant Rally: A gathering of hippies including many notable Haight-Ashbury luminaries is held in San Francisco, marking the LSD ban. The Grateful Dead and Janis Joplin perform for free. Despite the federal ban, the illicit manufacture and use of LSD continues.
 October 10: Good Vibrations: The Beach Boys release Brian Wilson and Mike Love's psychedelic tour de force.
 October 15: The Black Panther Party is established by Huey Newton and Bobby Seale in Oakland, CA.
 November 9: Beatle John Lennon first meets avant-garde Japanese artist and future wife Yoko Ono at London's Indica Gallery.
 November 12: For What It's Worth: The Sunset Strip teen curfew riots inspire Stephen Stills to pen the Buffalo Springfield protest song, West Hollywood, CA.
 December 8: MGM releases the British film Blow-Up without approval of the movie ratings group MPAA, signalling the beginning of the end of enforcement of the Hays Code. In late 1968, the MPAA institutes the first voluntary system of movie ratings, intended as a guide for viewers as to a film's content and age-appropriateness.
 December 17: Diggers "Death of Money" happening on Haight Street. Two Hells Angels who join the action are arrested, and a large crowd marches to the police station in spontaneous protest.
 December 23 & 30: UFO Club, London's first psychedelic nightclub opens. Hoppy and Joe Boyd hire an Irish venue, The Blarney Club on Tottenham Court Road, bringing the sound/light show of Pink Floyd and Soft Machine to the West End.
 December 30: Hoppy's London flat is raided. Hoppy and four others are arrested for possession of marijuana.

1967
 January 12: LSD is the subject of the debut "Blue Boy" episode of the topical, but square and sermon-laden police drama Dragnet '67.
 January 14: Human Be-In: "The joyful, face-to-face beginning of the new epoch" is held in Golden Gate Park, San Francisco. 20,000 attend.
 January 28: The Million Volt Light and Sound Rave: The Beatles contribute a to-date unreleased experimental "sound collage" for early raves at the Round House Theatre, London.
 January 29: The Mantra-Rock Dance is held at the Avalon Ballroom in San Francisco. Hare Krishna is promoted, and the Grateful Dead, Big Brother and the Holding Company and Moby Grape perform. Ginsberg, Leary and Owsley attend.
 February: Surrealistic Pillow by Jefferson Airplane is released. Grace Slick becomes the first female rockstar. Psilocybin mushrooms are visible on the album cover. Tracks include "White Rabbit", and "D.C.B.A.-25", referring to the song's chords and LSD-25.
 February: Noam Chomsky's anti-Vietnam War essay The Responsibility of Intellectuals is published in The New York Review of Books.
 February 5: The Smothers Brothers Comedy Hour debuts on CBS and soon pushes the boundaries of acceptable broadcast TV content to the limit.
 February 10: A Day in the Life: The Beatles stage a gathering of rock and other celebrities including Donovan, Keith Richards, Mick Jagger, Mike Nesmith and Pattie Boyd to observe the recording of the final orchestral overdubs for Sgt. Pepper, Abbey Road Studios, London.
 February 11: New York DJ Bob Fass uses the airwaves to inspire an impromptu gathering of thousands at Kennedy Airport, in what is later called a "prehistoric flash mob".
 February 13: The Beatles issue John Lennon's psychedelic masterwork "Strawberry Fields Forever" as part of a double A-side with "Penny Lane". "Cranberry sauce" is heard after the song fades out. Or is it "I buried Paul"?
 February 14: London's first Macrobiotic Restaurant run by Craig Sams opens at Centre House and also supplies food to the UFO Club.
 February 17: The cover of Life Magazine features Ed Sanders of The Fugs below "HAPPENINGS – The worldwide underground of the arts creates – THE OTHER CULTURE."
 February 22: MacBird! opens at the Village Gate in New York City and runs for 386 performances. The controversial play compares Lyndon Johnson to Shakespeare's Macbeth, who caused the death of his predecessor.
 March 26: 10,000 attend the New York City "Be-In" in Central Park.
 April 4: Beyond Vietnam: Dr. King delivers a monumental anti-war speech.
 April 8–10: Race riots break out in Nashville, Tennessee. Activist Stokely Carmichael and Allen Ginsberg are present.
 April 15: National Mobilization Committee to End the War in Vietnam: An estimated 400,000 protest the escalating Vietnam War in New York City, marching from Central Park to UN Headquarters. Martin Luther King Jr., James Bevel, Benjamin Spock, and Stokely Carmichael speak. 75,000 assemble in San Francisco where Coretta Scott King speaks.
 April 28: Boxing champion Muhammad Ali refuses induction into the US Army in Houston, TX, on the grounds that he is a conscientious objector to the war in Vietnam.
 April 29: The 14 Hour Technicolor Dream: Pink Floyd featuring Syd Barrett headlines for 7,000 attending a groundbreaking televised psychedelic rave to promote love and peace at Alexandra Palace, London.
 May: The radical left-wing underground newspaper Seed begins publication in Chicago.
 May 2: Armed Black Panthers led by Bobby Seale enter the California State Assembly in Sacramento, protesting a bill to outlaw open carry of loaded firearms. Seale and five others are arrested.
 May 5: Mr. Natural: Robert Crumb's soon to be ubiquitous underground comix counterculture icon, makes his first appearance in the premiere issue of Yarrowstalks.
 May 10: Rolling Stone Brian Jones is arrested for drug possession. He is arrested again in 1968. Jones' conviction record leaves him largely unable to tour outside of the UK.
 May 15–17: Student protesters confront police at Texas Southern University in Houston, resulting in the death of a police officer and over 400 arrests.
 May 20–21: The Spring Mobilization Conference is held in Washington, D.C. 700 anti-war activists gather to discuss the April 15 protests, and to plan future demonstrations.
 June: Vietnam Veterans Against the War is formed in New York City.
 June–July: Race riots create upheaval in cities across the US.
 June–September: The "Summer of Love" in Haight-Ashbury, San Francisco and recognition of the hippie movement.
 June 1: The Beatles' Sgt Pepper is released and widely recognized as the high-water mark of the brief psychedelic rock era. It is also later rated as the greatest rock album of all time.
 June 10–11: Fantasy Fair and Magic Mountain Music Festival: The Summer of Love kicks off at Mount Tamalpais, Marin County, California. Over 30,000 see the Byrds, Doors, Jefferson Airplane, Country Joe & the Fish, and dozens of other acts perform in the first rock festival gathering of its kind.
 June 12: The US Supreme Court in Loving v. Virginia rules that state laws prohibiting interracial marriage are unconstitutional.
 June 16: Paul McCartney is the first Beatle to publicly discuss LSD use. Quotes from a British magazine are re-published in a Life Magazine article entitled "The New Far-Out Beatles." McCartney is interviewed on film concerning the controversy on the 19th.
 June 16–18: The Monterey Pop Festival in Monterey, California, organized principally by John Phillips of The Mamas and the Papas, draws thousands and is the first large extended festival of the rock era. Jimi Hendrix returns from the UK and makes his US "debut." David Crosby uses microphone time to brashly condemn the Warren Report.
 June 25: The Beatles' contribute a performance of their summer UK hit All You Need Is Love to the first live global satellite TV broadcast, reaching an estimated 200–400 million worldwide via the BBC.
 July 7: The cover of Time features "The Hippies: The Philosophy of a Subculture."
 July 15–30: Dialectics of Liberation Congress: A gathering of leftist intellectuals in London is pranked when Digger Emmett Grogan delivers a speech to rousing applause. The audience then becomes irate when Grogan reveals that his words are culled entirely from a 1937 speech by Adolf Hitler. The episode later inspires a scene in the fictional 1971 cult film Billy Jack.
 July 16: Hyde Park Rally: 5,000 gather in London to protest "immoral in principle and unworkable in practice" UK marijuana laws. A petition signed by many notables is published.
 July 23–27: Detroit Riots: A dispute with police erupts into the worst outbreak of urban lawlessness of the century to date: 43 deaths, 467 injuries, over 7,200 arrests, and the burning of over 2,000 buildings to the ground.
 August 27: Death of Brian Epstein: credited with "discovering" the Beatles, their manager and friend dies of a prescription drug overdose in London at age 32.
 September 17: The Doors perform their hit "Light My Fire" on The Ed Sullivan Show, but fail to edit the perceived drug term "higher" from the lyric as instructed by producers.
 September 30: Hip Radio 1 commences broadcast over the legitimate airwaves of the BBC following the UK ban on offshore "pirate" radio transmissions.
 September: 18-year-old folk singer-songwriter Arlo Guthrie releases the 18-minute song Alice's Restaurant Massacree.
 October 2: 710 Ashbury Street: Members of the Grateful Dead and others are busted for drugs when their communal home is targeted and raided in San Francisco.
 October 9: Death of Che Guevara: The Argentine revolutionary is executed in Bolivia.
 October 17: Stop the Draft Week: Demonstrators mob the US Army Induction Center in Oakland, CA. Joan Baez is among those arrested. Some are charged with sedition.
 October 17: Hair: a timely stageplay featuring controversial full frontal nudity premieres to mature audiences off-Broadway in New York City. The play becomes a Broadway smash in 1968.
 October 19: Thousands of students clash with police at Brooklyn College in New York after two military recruiters appear on campus. Students strike the following day.
 October 20–21: "Mobe's" March on the Pentagon: 100,000 protest the war in Washington, DC. Jerry Rubin, Abbie Hoffman and others lead attempts at "exorcism" and levitation of the Pentagon.
 October 27: Baltimore Four: Catholic priest Philip Berrigan and three others are jailed after pouring blood on draft files in the SSS office, protesting bloodshed in Vietnam. Berrigan is later convicted.
 October 28: Black Panther leader Huey Newton is stopped by Oakland police. A shootout resulting in the death of an officer leads to Newton's conviction, which is later overturned.
 November 9: Rolling Stone Magazine: John Lennon is featured on the cover of the first issue in a photo from the film How I Won The War. Rolling Stone grows to become a focal point for news and reviews during the era, and beyond.
 November 10: Disraeli Gears: Cream's quintessential psychedelic rock album is released.
 November 10: The Moody Blues' masterpiece Days of Future Passed, featuring psychedelic themes and the London Festival Orchestra, is released.
 November 20: Police using tear gas charge a large student demonstration against corporate recruiters for napalm manufacturer Dow Chemical at San Jose State College.
 November 24: I Am the Walrus: The Beatles release John Lennon's psychedelic coda. The album Magical Mystery Tour arrives November 27.
 December 4–8: Anti-war groups across the US attempt to shut down draft board centers, Dr. Benjamin Spock and poet Allen Ginsberg are among the 585 arrested.
 December 10: Monterey Pop Fest standout and soon-to-be soul legend Otis Redding dies in a plane crash at age 26.
 December 22: Owsley Stanley is found in possession of 350,000 doses of LSD and 1,500 doses of STP, arrested, and sentenced to 3 years.
 December 31: Yippies: "Yippie" is coined by radicals Jerry Rubin, Abbie Hoffman, Anita Hoffman, Dick Gregory, Nancy Kurshan and Paul Krassner. In January, the Youth International Party is formed. Inspired by the Diggers, the humorous Yippies also take the counterculture protest movement into the realm of performance theater.
 Originally a surgical anesthetic, PCP begins to appear as a recreational drug.

1968
 Tom Wolfe's The Electric Kool-Aid Acid Test is published.
 January: Owsley-inspired pioneer Heavy Metal band Blue Cheer release Vincebus Eruptum, as early metal ground-breakers Iron Butterfly release their debut Heavy.
 January 22: Laugh-In: The sketch comedy "phenomenon that both reflected and mocked the era's counterculture", and brought it into "mainstream living rooms", debuts on US TV.
 January 31: The Tet Offensive is launched by the NVA and Vietcong. Western forces are victorious on the battlefield, but not in the press.
 February 1: Following the free-form programming experimentations at KFRC-FM in San Francisco, WABX-FM in Detroit and other stations nationwide begin to officially change format. FM playlists and other content are now chosen by local DJs, not corporate executives or record companies. The Progressive Rock format takes hold.
 February 4: Beat figure and Merry Prankster Neal Cassady dies in Mexico of unknown causes at age 41.
 February 8: Orangeburg Massacre: Police fire on and kill three protesting segregation at a South Carolina bowling alley.
 February 15: The Beatles in India: All four Beatles, along with fellow devotees such as Mike Love, Donovan and Mia Farrow, journey to Rishikesh in India to study Transcendental Meditation under Maharishi Mahesh Yogi. John Lennon and George Harrison are the last of the celebrities to leave; they depart amid unsubstantiated rumors of the Maharishi's sexual impropriety toward some of the female students and the band members' suspicions that he was using their fame for self-promotion.
 February 29: Kerner Report: The Report of the National Advisory Commission on Civil Disorders is released after seven months of investigation into US urban rioting, and states that "our nation is moving towards two societies, one black, one white – separate and unequal."
 March 16: My Lai Massacre in Vietnam. Apparent wanton rape and murder of innocents by US GIs creates enormous new anti-war outcry when news leaks in 1969.
 March 17: London police stop 10,000 anti-war marchers from violently storming the US Embassy. 200 are arrested. The protest serves as partial inspiration for the Rolling Stones' most notable political foray, "Street Fighting Man".
 March 18: RFK In: NY Senator Robert F. Kennedy, a long-time supporter of US policy in Vietnam, speaks out against the war for the first time, and announces his candidacy for president.
 March 22: 3,000 Yippies take over Grand Central Station in New York City, staging a "Yip-In" that ultimately results in an "extraordinary display of unprovoked police brutality" and 61 arrests.
 March 31: LBJ Out: Embattled President Lyndon Johnson addresses the US public about Vietnam on TV, and shocks the nation with his closing remark that he will focus on the war effort and not seek a second elected term as president.
 Spring: Reggae: "Nanny Goat" by Larry Marshall, and Do the Reggay by Toots and the Maytals mark the arrival of a new musical genre. Johnny Nash ("Hold Me Tight"), and Paul McCartney ("Ob-La-Di, Ob-La-Da") are inspired by the Jamaican sound.
 March–May: Columbia University protests, New York City. Up Against the Wall Motherfuckers becomes a protest slogan at this time, as well as the name of a radical activist group.
 April: The US Department of Defense begins calling-up reservists for duty in Vietnam. The US Supreme Court turns down a challenge to the mobilization in October.
 April 4: MLK Assassinated: The Reverend Dr. Martin Luther King Jr. is assassinated in Memphis, TN. Drifter James Earl Ray is soon arrested for the murder. The King family later expresses complete doubt as to Ray's guilt. Violence erupts in cities across the US, with thousands of Federal guardsman dispatched. Memphis, TN, Chicago, IL, Baltimore, MD, Kansas City, MO, and Washington, DC are hotspots.
 April 5: A Yippie plot to disrupt the upcoming August Democratic Convention in Chicago is published in Time.
 April 6: Oakland Shootout: Black Panther Bobby Hutton is killed and Eldridge Cleaver is wounded in a gun battle with police. Cleaver later claims that Hutton was murdered while in police custody.
 April 8: The US Bureau of Narcotics (from Treasury) and Bureau of Drug Abuse Control (from the Food and Drug Administration) merge into the Bureau of Narcotics and Dangerous Drugs, substantially ramping-up anti-drug efforts.
 April 14: The Easter Sunday "Love-In" is held in Malibu Canyon, CA.
 April 27: Anti-war protesters march in several US cities, including 87,000 in Central Park, NYC.
 May: The Fabulous Furry Freak Brothers first appear in The Rag, an Austin TX underground paper.
 May 2: MAI 68: Massive student protests erupt in France which escalate and spread, leading to a general strike and widespread civil unrest during May and June, bringing the country to a virtual standstill.
 May 10: The Paris Peace Talks commence in France. The war in Southeast Asia is the subject of the negotiations.
 May 12: Dr. King's Poor People's Campaign establishes "Resurrection City", a shanty town on the National Mall in Washington D.C., with around 5,000 protesters.
 May 17: Catonsville Nine: Catholic priests opposed to the war including Daniel Berrigan destroy draft records in a Maryland draft office.
 May 24–27: Louisville Riots: After a claim of police brutality, police and thousands of National Guard confront rioting protesters and looters. Two black teens die before order is restored.
 June 3: Artist Andy Warhol is shot and wounded by a "radical feminist" writer.
 June 5: RFK Assassinated: Senator Robert Francis Kennedy, winner of the California primary earlier that day, and the new presumptive Democratic presidential front-runner, is mortally wounded in Los Angeles. RFK dies June 6.
 June 19: "Solidarity Day" protest at Resurrection City draws 55,000 participants.
 June 24: Remnants of "Resurrection City", with only about 300 protesters still remaining, razed by riot police.
 July 17: The Beatles' post-psychedelic, pop-art animated film Yellow Submarine is released in the UK (November 13 in the US).
 July 28–30: University of California, Berkeley campus shut down by protests.
 August 21: Prague Spring: Communist tanks roll in Czechoslovakia and crush the popular anti-Soviet uprising which began in January.
 August 25–29: Democratic National Convention in Chicago. The proceedings are overshadowed by massive protests staged by thousands of demonstrators of every stripe. Mayor Daley's desire to enforce order in the city results in egregious police brutality, televised on national airwaves. On the third night, police indiscriminately attack protesters and bystanders, including journalists Mike Wallace, Dan Rather and Hugh Hefner. The spectacle is a turning point for both supporters and critics of the larger movement.
 August 26: Revolution?: Lennon's B-side to McCartney's smash "Hey Jude" is released. Its eschewing of violent protest is seen as a betrayal by some on the left. A version recorded earlier is released in November and suggests indecision as to Lennon's stance on violence.
 August 31: First Isle of Wight Festival featuring Jefferson Airplane, Arthur Brown, The Move, T-Rex and The Pretty Things.
 September 7: Miss America Protest: Feminists demonstrate against what they call "The Degrading Mindless-Boob-Girlie Symbol," filling a "freedom trash can" with items including mops, pots and pans, Cosmopolitan and Playboy magazines, false eyelashes, high-heeled shoes, curlers, hairspray, makeup, girdles, corsets, and bras. The widely reported "burning of bras" is, however, a myth.
 September 24: The Mod Squad: "One Black, One White, One Blonde" is the tagline for the hip, troubled-kids-turned-cops TV police drama which debuts on ABC.
 September 28: 10,000 in Chicago protest on one-month anniversary of the convention violence.
 Fall: Stewart Brand begins publication of The Whole Earth Catalog.
 October 2: Tlatelolco massacre: Students and police violently clash in Mexico City.
 October 16: Mexico '68: Medal-winning American sprinters Tommie Smith and John Carlos raise their gloved hands on the Olympic award podium to protest global human rights shortcomings. Their demonstration is met with both international praise and death threats alike.
 October 18: John Lennon and Yoko Ono are arrested for drug possession in London. Lennon is only fined for his first offence, and more serious obstruction charges against the pair are dropped, but the arrest will later serve as the pretext for the politically motivated attempted deportation of Lennon from the US in the 1970s.
 October 25: Emile de Antonio's highly controversial and Oscar nominated anti-war documentary In the Year of the Pig (per the Chinese "Year of the Pig") is released. Although it is otherwise reported, and de Antonio aspires to the leftist badge of honor, de Antonio technically never appears on President Nixon's Enemies List.
 October 27: 25,000 march in London against the Vietnam war.
 October 31: President Johnson orders a halt to the aerial bombing of North Vietnam.
 November 5: Former Vice President Richard M. Nixon defeats sitting VP Hubert Humphrey, and the George Wallace/Curtis Lemay ticket in a close race. Nixon in January becomes the 37th President of the US, ending eight years of Democratic Party control of the White House.
 November 6: Head: The Monkees delve into psychedelia in an ambitious but unpromoted and little seen film co-written and co-produced by Jack Nicholson.
 November 6: Students demanding minority studies courses begin a strike at San Francisco State College, where demonstrations and clashes occur into March 1969, making it the longest student strike in US history.
 November 11: Two Virgins: John Lennon and Yoko Ono's experimental album is released. Beatles distributors EMI (for Parlophone/Gramophone labels) and Capitol (for Apple label) refuse distribution, as the cover features the couple in shocking full frontal nudity. Lennon later describes the cover as a depiction of two slightly overweight ex-junkies.
 November 22: The Beatles' self-titled double album, also known as the "White Album", is released. The band's hair is very long, and the musical content is not psychedelic.
 December 24: Earthrise: A striking photograph of the Earth taken from lunar orbit is called "the most influential environmental photograph ever taken."

1969
 January 8–18: Students at Brandeis University take over Ford and Sydeman Halls, demanding creation of an Afro-American Dept., which is approved by the University on April 24.
 January 28: Santa Barbara Oil Spill: The environmental movement moves into high gear after an offshore oil well blows out and dumps 100,000 barrels of crude oil onto the California coast, killing wildlife and fouling beaches for years to come.
 January 29: Sir George Williams Computer Riot: the largest student campus occupation in Canadian history results in millions in damage in Montreal.
 January 30: Let it Be: The Beatles plus Billy Preston perform in public as a group for the last time on the roof atop their offices in London. Footage of the performance appears on the film documenting the sessions for the album.
 January 30 – February 15: Administration building of University of Chicago taken over by around 400 student protesters in a "sit-in".
 February: Esquire Magazine features a cover story declaring: "Chicks Up Front! How Troublemakers Use Girls to Put Down the Cops" and other tactics of the radical left.
 February 13: National Guard with tear gas and riot sticks crush demonstrations at the University of Wisconsin, Madison.
 February 16: After three days of clashes between police and Duke University students, the school agrees to establish a Black Studies program.
 February 24: Tinker v. Des Moines: The US Supreme court affirms public school students' First Amendment rights to protest the war.
 March 1: Do You Want to See My Cock?: Arrest warrants are issued for Doors frontman Jim Morrison after he allegedly exposes himself and simulates masturbation and fellatio at a concert in Miami, FL. In 2010, Morrison is posthumously pardoned by Florida's Clemency Board.
 March 12: George Harrison and Pattie Boyd are arrested for pot possession in London.
 March 22: President Nixon condemns trend of campus takeovers and violence.
 March 25–31: Following their wedding at Gibraltar, John Lennon and Yoko Ono hold a "Bed-In" peace event in Amsterdam.
 April: US troop strength in Vietnam peaks at over 543,000.
 April 3–4: National Guard called into Chicago, and Memphis placed on curfew on anniversary of Dr. King's assassination.
 April 4: After a decline in ratings, and ongoing pressure over highly controversial content, CBS cancels the Smothers Brothers Comedy Hour. Writers including Mason Williams, Carl Gottlieb, Bob Einstein, Rob Reiner, Steve Martin, and Pat Paulsen move on to other projects.
 April 9: 300 students "sit-in" at offices of Harvard protesting the ROTC. 400 police restore order April 10. The college makes ROTC extracurricular April 19.
 April 19: Armed black students take over Willard Straight Hall at Cornell. The university accedes to their demands the following day, promising an Afro-American studies program.
 April 25–28: Activist students takeover Merrill House at Colgate University demanding Afro-American studies programs.
 May 7: Students at Howard University occupy eight buildings. They are cleared by US Marshals May 9.
 May 8: City College of New York closes following a 14-day-long student takeover demanding minority studies; riots among students break out when CCNY tries to reopen.
 May 9–11: Zip to Zap: Several thousand college students flock to a party event in rural North Dakota, which degenerates into a "riot" later dispersed by the National Guard.
 May 15: Bloody Thursday: Alameda County Sheriffs and National Guardsman authorized by governor Ronald Reagan move to eject unlawful protestors from People's Park at Berkeley. They open fire with buckshot-loaded shotguns, mortally wounding student James Rector, permanently blinding carpenter Alan Blanchard, and inflicting lesser wounds on several others.
 May 21–25: 1969 Greensboro uprising: student protesters battle police for five days on campus of North Carolina Agricultural and Technical State University; one student killed May 22. National Guard assault the campus using tear gas, even dropping it by helicopter.
 May 23: Tommy: The Who's Rock Opera is a smash.
 May 26 – June 2: Give Peace a Chance: Celebrities gather as John and Yoko conduct their second Bed-In in Montreal, where the anti-war anthem is recorded live.
 June: Everything You Always Wanted to Know About Sex* (*But Were Afraid to Ask) is published and becomes a bestseller.
 June 18: SDS convenes in Chicago; they oust the Progressive Labor Party faction June 28, which sets up its own rival convention.
 June 22: Judy Garland, superstar of stage, screen, TV, and song, and early icon for the LGBT community, dies of an accidental barbiturate overdose, Chelsea, London.
 June 28: The Stonewall Riots in New York City are the first major gay-rights uprisings in the US.
 July 3: Brian Jones, founder of the Rolling Stones, dies "by misadventure" in his swimming pool in East Sussex, UK, under mysterious circumstances at age 27.
 July 5: The Stones in the Park: Shocked by the overdose death of former bandmate Brian Jones, the grieving Rolling Stones continue with their much-anticipated free concert before a massive crowd at Hyde Park, London.
 July 14: Easy Rider: The low-budget, cocaine-dealing biker road movie is released and becomes a de facto cultural landmark. The film's success helps open doors for independent film makers of the 1970s. The soundtrack includes Steppenwolf's seminal ode to bikers "Born to be Wild," and the early anti-drug dirge "The Pusher."
 July 15: Cover story on LOOK: "How Hippies Raise their Children"
 July 18: Cover story on Life: "The Youth Communes – New Way of Living Confronts the U.S."
 July 20: Apollo 11's Apollo Lunar Module lands. Humans walk on the Moon. A plaque with the inscription "We Came in Peace for All Mankind" is left on the lunar surface.
 July 21: Andy Warhol's Blue Movie premieres at the New Andy Warhol Garrick Theatre. The movie is a seminal film in the Golden Age of Porn and helps inaugurate the "porno chic" phenomenon in modern American culture, and later, in many other countries throughout the world.
 July 25: Vietnamization: RMN's Nixon Doctrine calls on Asian regional allies formerly guaranteed protection under treaty to fend for themselves in non-nuclear conflicts.
 August 9–10: Helter Skelter: Actress Sharon Tate, Tate's unborn baby, and five others are viciously murdered at knifepoint by cult members acting under the direction of psychopath Charles Manson during a two-day killing spree in California. The events shock the nation. For many, the crimes and Manson's "family" are seen as products of the counterculture.
 August 15–18: Woodstock: An estimated 300,000–500,000 people gather in upstate New York for "3 Days of Peace & Music" at the watershed event in counterculture history.
 August 19: Immediately following Woodstock, David Crosby, Stephen Stills, Joni Mitchell and Jefferson Airplane appear on the Dick Cavett Show. The Airplane's lyric "Up against the wall, motherfuckers!" in the performance of "We Can Be Together" slips past the censors and airs on national television.
 August 30–31: Second Isle of Wight Festival attracts 150,000 people to see acts including Bob Dylan and The Band, The Who, Free, Joe Cocker, and the Moody Blues.
 September: Penthouse: The first US issue of Robert Guccione's explicit monthly hits newsstands, and is later called "the adult magazine that wormed its way into the kinkier recesses of the libidinal subconscious and, arguably, did more to liberate puritan America from its deepest sexual taboos than any magazine before or since."
 September 1–2: Race rioting in Hartford, CT and Camden, NJ.
 September 2: Ho Chi Minh, President of communist North Vietnam, aggressor and prime mover of the Vietnam War, dies. Ho's war rages on after his death.
 September 6: H.R. Pufnstuf: the highly novel, surreal Saturday morning children's show debuts on US TV.
 September 24: The Chicago Eight trial commences. Tom Hayden, Abbie Hoffman, Jerry Rubin, et al., face charges including conspiracy to incite riots during the 1968 Democratic National Convention. They become the Chicago Seven November 5 after defendant Bobby Seale is bound, gagged, and severed from the proceedings.
 September 29: "Okie from Muskogee": Country legend Merle Haggard's song is a huge hit with those opposed to drug use and the protest activities of the counterculture.
 October 4: TV star Art Linkletter's daughter Diane, 20, jumps to her death from her 6th story apartment. The elder Linkletter claims Timothy Leary and LSD are responsible.
 October 8–11: Days of Rage: Elements of the SDS and the Weather Underground faction continue radical efforts to "bring the war home" in Chicago, and exchange brutalities with Chicago Police.
 October 15: Moratorium to End the War in Vietnam: Massive anti-war demonstrations across the US and world.
 October 21: Jack Kerouac dies from complications of alcoholism in Florida at age 47.
 October 29: "login": The first message on the ARPANET – precursor to the internet and WWW – is sent by UCLA student programmer Charley Kline.
 November 13: Vice President Spiro T. Agnew publicly criticizes the three mainstream television networks for their lack of favorable coverage.
 November 15: Moratorium redux: over 500,000 march in Washington, DC. It is the largest anti-war demonstration in US history.
 November 20: Native American protesters begin the Occupation of Alcatraz, which continues for 19 months.
 December: Total US casualties (dead and seriously wounded) in Vietnam total 100,000.
 December 1: The first draft lottery in the US since World War II is held in New York City and broadcast live on CBS. Later statistical analysis indicates the lottery method (birthdates in capsules pulled from a hand-rotated drum) is flawed, leaving certain birthdates more likely to be drawn than others.
 December 4: Black Panther Fred Hampton is killed by combined elements of Federal, Illinois State, and Chicago law enforcement under circumstances which to some suggest political assassination.
 December 6: Altamont: The Rolling Stones help organize and headline at a free concert attended by 300,000. The event, intended as a "Woodstock West," devolves into chaos and violent death at a speedway between Tracy and Livermore, CA.
 December 27–31: Flint War Council, Michigan. SDS is abolished, the Weathermen break off, and one of the most significant seditious revolts since the US Civil War emerges.
 Wavy Gravy's Hog Farm Hippie commune is established near Llano, NM.
 Friends of the Earth is founded in the US. It becomes an international network in 1971.
 Making of a Counter Culture: Theodore Roszak's Reflections on the Technocratic Society is published. Roszak is later credited with coining the term "counterculture" in print.

1970s

1970
 President Nixon establishes the US Environmental Protection Agency (EPA). The agency is activated in December 1970.
 January 1: Voting age in Britain lowered from 21 to 18.
 January 10: Musician, hippie, and philanthropic margarine heir Michael J. Brody, Jr. announces he will give away his fortune, which he reports to be $25–50 million.
 January 31: Set Up, Like a Bowling Pin: 19 people including members of the Grateful Dead and Owsley Stanley are busted for drugs in New Orleans. The episode makes the cover of Rolling Stone in March, and is later mentioned in the Dead song "Truckin' ".
 February: Weather Underground bombings and arsons in US states of NY, CA, WA, MD, & MI.
 February 18: Chicago 7 verdicts are handed down: two are exonerated, five are soon sentenced for "crossing state lines with intent to incite a riot", but all the convictions and sentences are later reversed.
 February 23–26: Students riot at University of California-Santa Barbara.
 February 25–28: Students riot, occupy campus buildings, etc. at SUNY Buffalo, NY.
 March 6: Greenwich Village townhouse explosion: Three members of the Weather Underground are killed while assembling a bomb in New York City.
 March 26: The documentary film Woodstock is released.
 Late March: Fleetwood Mac founder Peter Green and bandmate Danny Kirwan get waylaid at a bizarre party at the Highfisch-Kommune cult/commune, Munich. After apparently taking LSD, both Green and Kirwan thereafter reportedly suffer from lifelong mental illness.
 April 1: Jerry Rubin guest appears the Phil Donahue Show and lambastes Donahue for his conservative appearance.
 April 7: California Governor Ronald Reagan is quoted on college campus student unrest: "If it takes a blood bath, let's get it over with."
 April 7: X-Rated Midnight Cowboy wins three Oscars including Best Picture in Hollywood.
 April 10: Paul McCartney, when promoting his first solo album, announces that the Beatles have disbanded.
 April 15: 100,000 gather on Boston Common to protest the Vietnam War; about 500 radicals attempt to seize microphone, disrupting meeting.
 April 22: Earth Day: The first event recognizing the precarious environmental state of planet earth is held.
 April 30: President Nixon reveals secret US military operations in Cambodia.
 May 1–3: 13,000 people take part in peaceful demonstrations at Yale University in support of defendants in the New Haven Black Panther trials.
 May 2: Radicals among the students at Kent State University protesting the spread of the war into Cambodia burn the ROTC building to the ground. Ohio Governor Jim Rhodes calls in the National Guard at the request of Kent's Mayor.
 May 4: In what is perhaps the greatest tragedy of the stateside anti-war protest movement, poorly trained soldiers of the Ohio National Guard are set loose into confrontation with – and open fire on – unarmed students at Kent State University leaving four dead and nine wounded, including Dean Kahler, who was paralyzed.
 May 4: Holding Together: A benefit for Timothy Leary is held at the Village Gate in NYC. Jimi Hendrix and Johnny Winter perform.
 May 5: The International Nuclear Nonproliferation Treaty takes effect.
 May 6: Student Strike of 1970: Many colleges across the US shut down in protest of the war and the Kent State events.
 May 8: Hard Hat Riot: Construction workers confront anti-war demonstrators, Wall St., New York City. They march again May 11. On May 20, 100,000 construction workers and longshoremen demonstrate in favor of administration war policy at New York City Hall.
 May 8: Attempting to "rescue" his child from what he believes to be a hippie commune, father Arville Garland murders his daughter Sandra and three others as they sleep in Detroit. The events are eerily similar to those depicted in the hippie-bashing film Joe, which was filmed prior to – but released after – the murders.
 May 9: 100,000 rally against war in Washington, DC. At 4:15am, President Nixon defies Secret Service security, and leaves the White House to meet and chat with surprised protesters camping out at the Lincoln Memorial.
 May 14: Jackson State killings: Police kill two and injure 11 during violent student demonstrations at Jackson State College, MS. This is two days after six African-American men were fatally shot in the back for violating curfew in Augusta by the Georgia National Guard.
 May 19: Student riot at Fresno State University.
 May 21: 5,000 National Guard troops occupy Ohio State University following violence.
 June 11: Daniel Berrigan is arrested by the FBI for kidnapping/bombing conspiracy.
 June 12: Major League Baseball pitcher Dock Ellis takes LSD on what he mistakenly believes is an off day, and throws a no-hitter. Ellis later quits drugs, becomes a recovery counselor, and expresses regret over drug abuse during his playing career.
 June 13: President Nixon appoints the President's Commission on Campus Unrest. The report issued in September finds a direct correlation between the unrest and the level of US military involvement in Indochina.
 June 15: The US Supreme Court confirms conscientious objector protection on moral grounds.
 June 22: The US voting age is lowered to 18. This is soon challenged and overturned in the Supreme Court, leading to the swift adoption of the 26th Amendment on June 1, 1971, guaranteeing suffrage at 18.
 June 27–28: Bath Festival of Blues and Progressive Music, Shepton Mallet, Somerset, UK, featuring Hot Tuna, Fleetwood Mac, Led Zeppelin, Pink Floyd and many more.
 July: Huston Plan: A broad, cross-agency scheme for illegal domestic surveillance of anti-war figures is concocted by a White House staffer, and accepted but then quickly quashed by President Nixon. Elements of the plan were, however, allegedly implemented in any event.
 August 6: Riot police evacuate Disneyland in Anaheim, CA after a few hundred Yippies stage a protest.
 August 17: Communist activist Angela Davis appears on the FBI's Ten Most Wanted list after a firearm purchased in her name is linked to a murder plot involving a judge.
 August 24: The Sterling Hall Bombing at the University of Wisconsin in Madison by anti-war activists kills physics researcher Robert Fassnacht. Four others are severely injured, and millions of dollars in damages occur.
 August 26: Women's Strike for Equality: 50 years after US women's suffrage, 20,000 celebrate and march in New York City, demanding true equality for women in American life.
 August 26–31: 600,000+ attend Third Isle of Wight Festival. Over fifty acts including The Who, Hendrix, Miles Davis, The Doors, Ten Years After, ELP, Joni Mitchell, and Jethro Tull.
 August 29–30: Rioting and violence erupts at Chicano Moratorium anti-war rally in Los Angeles; reporter Rubén Salazar is killed by a tear gas shell.
 September: Jesus Christ Superstar, the Christian Rock Opera, debuts as an album. It later becomes a smash on Broadway and on film.
 September: Alan "Blind Owl" Wilson, acclaimed musician and co-founder of Canned Heat, dies of a prescription barbiturate overdose at Topanga Canyon, CA, at age 27.
 September 12: Timothy Leary escapes prison with help from the Weather Underground, and joins Eldridge Cleaver in Algiers.
 September 16: London: Apolitical hard rock act Led Zeppelin end the Beatles' 8-year run as Melody Maker's world #1 group of the year.
 September 18: Influential musician Jimi Hendrix dies from complications of a probable drug overdose at age 27 in London.
 September 19: Pilton Pop, Blues & Folk Festival, the first ever Glastonbury Festival, features T-Rex and is attended by 1,500 people.
 October: The Female Eunuch: Germaine Greer's pro-feminist bestseller is published.
 October: Keith Stroup founds NORML, a group working to end marijuana prohibition, in Washington, DC.
 October 4: Janis Joplin, rock's first solo female superstar, dies as the result of an apparent accidental heroin overdose at age 27 in Los Angeles.
 October 13: Political activist Angela Davis is arrested on kidnapping, murder, and conspiracy charges.
 October 26: Doonesbury debuts as a syndicated comic strip, acknowledges the counterculture, and continues to chronicle events into the 21st century.
 October 29: President Nixon is pelted with eggs by an unfriendly crowd of 2000 after giving a speech in San Jose, CA.
 November 7: Jerry Rubin appears live on The David Frost Show and tries to pass a joint to the talkshow host, the signal for Yippies in the audience to rush the stage and protest.
 December 6: The Maysles Brothers release their film documentary of Altamont: Gimme Shelter.
 December 21: Elvis Presley arrives unannounced at the White House. The King meets and is photographed with President Nixon. They discuss patriotism, hippies, and the war on drugs.
 December 25: Laguna Beach Christmas Happening: Thousands gather for an extended hippie festival, featuring an airdrop of hundreds of Christmas cards, each containing a dose of "Orange Sunshine" LSD courtesy of The Brotherhood of Eternal Love, or the "Hippie Mafia," an acid-manufacturing and hash-smuggling organization bent on "psychedelic revolution."
 December: Paul McCartney sues to dissolve the Beatles.
 The violent Black Liberation Army is formed in the US. A series of bombings, murders, robberies, prison breaks, and an airline hijacking ensue before the group fades from view in the early 1980s.

1971
 January 1: Punishment Park is released in theaters.
 January 2: The ban on cigarette advertising on US TV and radio takes effect.
 January 12: Styled after the UK TV hit Till Death Us Do Part, the long-running US smash All in the Family debuts with Rob Reiner as Michael Stivic, the counterculture's college-educated answer to the working-class Archie Bunker.
 January 31: Police fire on a peace march in Los Angeles, killing one.
 February 4: A military induction center in Oakland, CA is bombed.
 February 4–8: Rioting in Wilmington, NC leaves 2 dead.
 February 13: An induction center in Atlanta, GA is bombed.
 February 21: The UN Convention on Psychotropic Substances is signed in Vienna, with the intention of controlling psychoactive drugs such as amphetamines, barbiturates, benzodiazepines, and psychedelics at the international level.
 March 1: The US Capitol building is bombed by war protesters; no injuries, but extensive damage results.
 March 5: The FCC says that it can penalize radio stations for playing music that seems to glorify or promote illegal drug usage.
 March 8: The Fight of the Century: Conscientious Objector and counterculture hero Muhammad Ali loses to default symbol of the pro-war right Joe Frazier at Madison Square Garden, NYC, in what is widely considered to be the greatest heavyweight fight in boxing history.
 March 11: Rioting at University of Puerto Rico leaves 3 dead.
 April 23: Vietnam veterans protest against the war at the US Capitol in Washington, DC, throw their medals on the steps, and testify to US war crimes.
 April 24: 500,000 protesters rally at US Capitol to petition for an end to the war; 200,000 rally against the war in San Francisco.
 May 3: Over 12,000 anti-war protesters are arrested on the third day of the 1971 May Day Protests in Washington, DC.
 May 10: Attorney General John N. Mitchell compares the anti-war protesters to Nazis, and on May 13, calls them Communists.
 May 12: The wedding of Mick Jagger and Nicaraguan beauty Bianca Pérez-Mora Macias is celebrated by hippies and jet-setters alike, but is marred by a media circus with fisticuffs at Saint-Tropez on the French Riviera. The couple splits in 1977.
 May 17: The play Godspell opens in New York, depicting Jesus and his disciples in a contemporary, countercultural milieu.
 May 21: Marvin Gaye releases the socially conscious album What's Going On.
 May 31: US military personnel in London petition at US Embassy against the Vietnam War.
 June 13: Pentagon Papers: The New York Times publishes the first excerpt of illegally leaked secret US military documents detailing US intervention in Indochina since 1945. A Federal Court injunction on June 15 temporarily stops the releases.
 June 18: The Washington Post publishes excerpts from the Pentagon Papers, halted by court order the following day.
 June 20–24 : 'Glastonbury Fayre', the second Glastonbury Festival, features David Bowie, Traffic, Fairport Convention, and the first incarnation of the "Pyramid Stage".
 June 22: The Boston Globe publishes Pentagon Papers excerpts; this is halted by injunction on the 23rd and the newspapers are impounded.
 June 28: Muhammad Ali's conviction for draft resistance is unanimously overturned by the US Supreme Court in Washington, DC.
 June 28: President Nixon releases all 47 volumes of Pentagon Papers to Congress.
 June 30: Supreme Court rules 6–3 that newspapers have a right to publish the Pentagon Papers. The Times and Post resume publication the following day.
 July 3: Jim Morrison, founding member of The Doors, dies of a probable heroin overdose at age 27 in Paris.
 July 7: Two-Lane Blacktop: The cult classic starring Dennis Wilson and James Taylor premieres.
 August 1: Concert for Bangladesh: George Harrison and Ravi Shankar, and friends including Ringo Starr, Eric Clapton, Leon Russell, Billy Preston and Bob Dylan, stage a landmark charity event in New York City. Popular albums and a film follow, and the shows become a model for huge rock benefits such as Live Aid.
 August 18: Attorney General Mitchell announces there will be no Federal investigation of the 1970 Kent State shootings.
 August: Cheech & Chong's eponymous first album is released.
 September 3: Burglars operating under the direction of White House officials break into the office of Daniel Ellsburg's psychiatrist in a botched attempt to find files to discredit the Pentagon Papers leaker.
 September 9: Attica: Prisoners take control, hold hostages, and riot over rights and living conditions at Attica State Prison, NY. 39 die (including 10 corrections officers) before most prisoner demands are met and order is restored.
 September 15: Greenpeace is founded in Vancouver, BC and soon becomes the most prominent, and most controversial, international activist environmental organization.
 October: est, the controversial self-improvement training program holds its first conference in San Francisco.
 October 8: Three FBI informants reveal on PBS that they were paid to infiltrate anti-war groups and instigate them to commit violent acts which could be prosecuted.
 October 19–23: Rioting in Memphis leaves one dead.
 October 29: Guitar phenomenon Duane Allman of the Allman Brothers Band is killed in a motorcycle accident in Macon, GA at age 24. Allman bassist Berry Oakley dies, also in a motorcycle crash, only blocks away the following year.
 November 10: Berkeley, CA City Council votes to provide sanctuary to all military deserters.
 November 10: Ringo Starr and Keith Moon co-star with Frank Zappa and the Mothers of Invention in Zappa's "surrealistic documentary" 200 Motels.
 November 16: Socialite, early supermodel, and Andy Warhol "Superstar" Edie Sedgwick dies at 28 after an overdose of alcohol and barbiturates, Santa Barbara, CA.
 November: Fear and Loathing in Las Vegas, Hunter S. Thompson's drug-drenched indictment of 1960s counterculture, is published in Rolling Stone in 2 parts.
 December 4: Smoke on the Water: Rockers Deep Purple are disrupted in the process of recording Machine Head when the hall they intend to use for recording is burned down by a fan during a Frank Zappa concert, Montreux, Switzerland.
 December 10: John Sinclair Freedom Rally: John Lennon and other notables including Stevie Wonder and Bob Seger perform, and Bobby Seale, Jerry Rubin, Allen Ginsberg, Rennie Davis, Ed Sanders and others speak at Crisler Arena in Ann Arbor to protest the treatment of Sinclair, who gave two pot joints to an undercover cop and was sentenced to 10 years in prison.
 December 26–28: 15 Vietnam veterans occupy the Statue of Liberty to protest the war.
 December 28: Anti-war veterans attempt takeover of Lincoln Memorial in Washington, D.C. 80 are arrested.
 December 29: Boys in the Sand, a milestone American gay pornographic film, presented at the beginnings of the Golden Age of Porn, premiers at the 55th Street Playhouse, NYC. Boys in the Sand was the first such film to be reviewed by Variety Magazine, and one of the earliest porn films, after 1969's Blue Movie by Andy Warhol, to gain mainstream validity.
 December: Feminism comes of age: Gloria Steinem's Ms. magazine is first published as an insert in New York magazine. The first standalone issue arrives the following month.
 Stephen Gaskin establishes "The Farm" hippie commune in Tennessee.
 Saul Alinsky's Rules for Radicals is published.
 Abbie Hoffman's Steal This Book is published.
 The Anarchist Cookbook is published.
 Our Bodies, Ourselves is published.
 Rainbow Bridge, Chuck Wein's film depicting the counterculture on Maui, and featuring the second-to-last live performance by Jimi Hendrix, is released.

1972
 February 1: The Needle and the Damage Done: Neil Young releases a moving musical testimonial of friends lost to deadly narcotics during the era. Growth of heroin use flattens out in the 1970s, but the drug is considered "hip" and use explodes again within unindoctrinated generations in the 1990s and beyond.
 March: The Nixon administration begins deportation proceedings against John Lennon, on the pretext of his 1968 hashish charge in London.
 March 22: The National Commission on Marihuana and Drug Abuse, appointed by President Nixon, finds "little danger" in cannabis, recommending abolition of all criminal penalties for possession.
 April 1: The first Hash Bash is held on the campus of the University of Michigan, Ann Arbor.
 April 16: Facing heavy ground losses, US forces resume the bombing of Northern Vietnam.
 April 17–18: Students at University of Maryland protesting the bombing battle with police and National Guard are sent in.
 April 22: Large anti-war marches in New York, San Francisco, and Los Angeles.
 May 2: US FBI Director J. Edgar Hoover dies at 77 after nearly 50 years of virtually unchallenged control over the principal federal law enforcement agency.
 May 15: Wallace Shot: Disavowed segregationist and Alabama Governor George Wallace is shot and paralyzed at a presidential primary campaign event in Laurel, MD.
 May 19: Weather Underground bomb at the Pentagon causes damage but no injuries.
 May 21–22: 15,000 demonstrate in Washington against the war.
 June 4: Angela Davis is acquitted on all counts in her weapons trial.
 June 12: John Lennon's Plastic Ono Band releases the politically charged double album Some Time in New York City.
 June 17: The Watergate burglars are arrested in Washington, DC.
 June 23: U.S. public schools can no longer require girls to wear dresses and must allow them to wear pants, with the Education Amendments of 1972.
 July 28: Actress Jane Fonda visits North Vietnam. Fonda's return incites outrage when a photograph of her seated on an enemy anti-aircraft gun is published, and she insists that POWs held captive have not been tortured or brainwashed by the communists. Fonda continues to apologize for aspects of the episode.
 July: The first Rainbow Gathering of the Tribes is held over 4 days in Colorado, US.
 October 26: October Surprise?: US National Security Advisor Henry Kissinger tells a White House press conference that "we believe that peace is at hand."
 November 2–8: About 500 protesters from the American Indian Movement take over the Bureau of Indian Affairs in Washington.
 November 7: Republican Richard Nixon is re-elected in a landslide over progressive Democratic Senator George McGovern.
 November 16: Police kill 2 students during campus rioting at Southern University in Baton Rouge, Louisiana.
 November 21: A Federal Appeals Court overturns the conviction of the "Chicago 7" members.
 December 18–29: US Operation Linebacker II becomes most intensive bombing campaign of the war.
 The Joy of Sex: Unthinkable a decade earlier, the widely read sex manual for the liberated 1970s is published and openly displayed in mainstream bookstores.
 Michael X, a self-styled black revolutionary and civil rights activist in 1960s London, is convicted of murder. He is executed by hanging in Port of Spain, Trinidad and Tobago in 1975.

1973
 January 1: Bangladeshis burn down the US Information Service in Dacca in protest of the bombing of North Vietnam.
 January 2: Aerial bombing of North Vietnam resumes after a 36-hour New Year's truce.
 January 4: Forty neutral member nations of the UN formally protest the US bombing campaign.
 January 5: Canada's Parliament votes unanimously to condemn US bombing actions and calls for them to cease.
 January 10: Anti-war demonstrators attack US consulate in Lyons, France, and burn down the library of America House in Frankfurt, West Germany.
 January 10: The US EPA is sued to make them take action to begin reducing tetraethly lead in gasoline; David Schoenbrod of the Natural Resources Defense Council successfully wins on appeal.
 January 15: Anti-war protesters occupy US consulate in Amsterdam.
 January 15: President Nixon suspends the bombing, citing progress in the Peace talks with Hanoi. West German Chancellor Willy Brandt warns Nixon that US relations with Western Europe are at risk.
 January 22: Former US President Lyndon B. Johnson dies at 64 after a heart attack at his Texas ranch.
 January 22: The US Supreme Court rules on Roe v. Wade, effectively legalizing abortion.
 January 28: US combat military involvement in Vietnam ends with a ceasefire, and commencement of withdrawal as called for under the Paris Peace Accords.
 February 27 – May 8: Wounded Knee incident: Native American activists occupy the town of Wounded Knee, SD; 2 protesters and 1 US Marshal are killed during a lengthy standoff.
 March: The first military draftees who are not subsequently called to service are selected, unceremoniously ending the Vietnam era of conscription in the US.
 March 8: Ron "Pigpen" McKernan, a founding member of the Grateful Dead, dies of a gastrointestinal hemorrhage at age 27 in Corte Madera, CA.
 March 29: War Ends: President Nixon announces that the last US combat troops have left Vietnam as US POWs have been released.
 May 17: The Senate Watergate Committee begins televised hearings on the ever-growing Watergate scandal implicating the President for gross abuses of power.
 July 1: The Drug Enforcement Administration supplants the BNDD.
 July 10: John Paul Getty III, 16, grandson of miserly oil billionaire and world's richest man Jean Paul Getty, is kidnapped for ransom in Rome. The negotiated payment of about $3 million is only made after the junior Getty's ear is excised and mailed back to a newspaper. The youth survives, but becomes a drug addict and stroke victim, and dies in 2011 at 54.
 July 28: Summer Jam at Watkins Glen, NY draws 600,000 to see the Grateful Dead, the Band, and the Allman Brothers – the largest such gathering in the US since Woodstock.
 August 15: All US military involvement in Indochina conflict officially ends under the Case–Church Amendment.
 September 19: In one of the most bizarre series of events of the era, celebrated journeyman country rock musician Gram Parsons dies of a morphine overdose after visiting Joshua Tree National Monument; his body is "stolen" by well-meaning friends attempting to fulfill Parson's funerary wishes and set afire at Joshua Tree. A film account of the misadventures is released in 2003.
 September 20: Folk singer-songwriters Jim Croce and Maury Muehleisen are killed along with 5 others after their chartered tour plane crashes on takeoff in Louisiana.
 September 20: The Battle of the Sexes: In a heavily hyped match promoted as a sports battle between male and female, tennis champs Billie Jean King and Bobby Riggs compete at the Astrodome. King defeats Riggs in three straight sets.
 October 10: Vice President Spiro Agnew resigns. President Nixon names Congressman Gerald R. Ford of Michigan to replace Agnew on October 12.
 October 23: Congress begins to consider articles of impeachment against Nixon.
 November 14: Greece: Students at Athens Polytechnic strike against the military junta. Tanks roll the 17th and at least 24 die.
 November 17: At a session with 400 AP editors, President Nixon states, "People have got to know whether or not their President is a crook. Well, I'm not a crook. I've earned everything I've got."

1974
 Saddled by a decade of drug-related legal problems, Timothy Leary reportedly becomes an informant for the FBI.
 January 3: A Federal judge dismisses charges against 12 members of the Weathermen involved in the October 1969 "Days of Rage".
 February 5: Patty Hearst is kidnapped by extremist group the Symbionese Liberation Army (SLA) and joins them, possibly after becoming a victim of Stockholm syndrome.
 March–April: Short-lived fad of "streaking" is at its height in the US.
 April 20: Disco music, following the success of "Love Train" a year earlier, again hits number one on the Billboard charts with "TSOP", a clear sign that the post-"sixties counterculture" era is now at hand. The punk rock subculture also traces its genesis to around this time, with groups like Ramones and Television playing the CBGB club in NYC.
 May 17: Five SLA members including their leader are killed fighting police during a standoff in Los Angeles.
 Summer: First issue of High Times is published.
 July 29: Singing star "Mama" Cass Elliot, 32, dies after a heart attack in the London flat of Harry Nilsson. Who drummer Keith Moon, also 32, dies of an overdose of an anti-alcoholism drug in the same home in 1978.
 August 8: Facing imminent impeachment, Richard Nixon announces he will resign as President of the United States. Vice President Gerald Ford is sworn in as president on August 9 and declares "our long national nightmare is over."
 September–December: Police repeatedly quell unrest as desegregation comes to Boston high schools.
 September 8: President Ford fully pardons former president Nixon.
 September 16: President Ford offers conditional amnesty to military deserters and evaders of the Vietnam era draft, creating a path for re-entry into the US.
 December 13: President Ford invites George Harrison to luncheon at the White House. Peter Frampton visits in 1976.
 December 21: The New York Times reports that the CIA illegally spied on 10,000 anti-war dissidents under Nixon's presidency.

1975
 January 1: John Mitchell and three other Watergate conspirators are found guilty and sentenced to prison Feb. 21.
 January 27: Church Committee: The US Senate votes to begin unprecedented investigation into US intelligence activities, including illegal spying on domestic radicals.
 January 29: Weather Underground bomb at the US State Department, none injured.
 April 30: Operation Frequent Wind: The last remaining US military and intelligence personnel escape Saigon as South Vietnam is invaded and annexed by communist forces, in direct violation of the so-called "Peace" Accords.
 September 5 & 22: US President Ford survives assassination attempts by two women, including a failed attempt by Manson "family" member Lynette "Squeaky" Fromme, in one month.
 September 18: Patty Hearst is arrested by the FBI.
 October 7: A New York State Supreme Court judge reverses the deportation order against John Lennon, allowing Lennon to legally remain in the US.
 October 11: Saturday Night Live: The counterculture comes of age as George Carlin hosts the first episode of the mainstream TV revue. The long-running series soon features many notable American TV firsts, including open depiction of marijuana use in comedy sketches.

1977
 January 21: Newly inaugurated US President Jimmy Carter unconditionally pardons thousands of Vietnam draft evaders, allowing them to re-enter the US, mostly from Canada.
 August 16: Elvis Presley, the most significant progenitor of the rock era, early critic of the counterculture, and biggest selling individual recording artist of all time dies at age 42 from complications of prescription drug abuse in Memphis, Tennessee.

1980s

1980
 December 8: John Lennon, 40, founding member of the Beatles and standard-bearer of the counterculture generation, is murdered in New York, triggering an outpouring of grief around the world.

See also
 Counterculture of the 1960s
 Opposition to U.S. involvement in the Vietnam War: Timeline
List of protests against the Vietnam War
 Timeline of the civil rights movement

References

External links
 1960s archive with photographs of be-ins and protests
 The 1960s: Years that Shaped a Generation

 
1960s counterculture
Timeline
1960s counterculture
1960s counterculture
1960s counterculture
1960s counterculture
196069 counterculture